is a Japanese tokusatsu science fiction film released in January 1956 by Daiei, and was the first Japanese science fiction film to be produced in color. In the film's plot, starfish-like aliens disguised as humans travel to Earth to warn of the imminent collision of a rogue planet and Earth. As the planet rapidly accelerates toward Earth, a nuclear device is created at the last minute and destroys the approaching world.

The film, directed by Koji Shima, was one of many early Japanese monster films quickly produced after the success of Toho's Godzilla in 1954. After release, the film was met with negative reviews, with critics calling it "bizarre" and accusing it of using science fiction clichés. Warning from Space influenced many other Japanese science fiction films, such as Gorath. The film, along with other 1950s tokusatsu science fiction films, influenced director Stanley Kubrick, who would later direct 2001: A Space Odyssey.

Plot
A small ship travels to a rotating space station. Aboard the station, a group of starfish-like beings called Pairan discuss how to warn humans of an impending disaster, deciding on contacting Japanese scientist Dr. Kumara. Meanwhile, flying saucers are spotted over the skies of Tokyo, baffling scientists. A journalist tries to get a statement from Dr. Kumara about the sightings, but Kumara replies that there is not enough evidence to formulate a hypothesis. At an observatory, Professor Isobe spots an object in his telescope apparently releasing smaller objects.

Isobe discusses his findings with Kumara and a physician, Dr. Matsuda, who believes they should get photographs via a rocket. The photographs they retrieve, however, turn out to be unclear, though they deduce the object has a high energy output. In the meantime, the extraterrestrials have been unsuccessfully attempting to contact humans. They begin appearing in lakes and rivers, frightening local fishermen and sailors. One of the aliens manages to secure a photo of Hikari Aozora, a famous Japanese entertainer.  Their plan is for one of the aliens to mutate into the form of Aozora.  Back aboard the space station, one of the Pairan leaders, Ginko, volunteers herself. Her starfish form is slowly mutated into a human form.

On Earth, Toru, Isobe's son, discovers the disguised alien floating in the water. After her rescue, she exhibits superhuman characteristics such as jumping ten feet and materializing in different places without walking. Soon, she disrupts Dr. Matsuda's work on a nuclear device, explaining she understands the complex equations he was writing and warning against the effects of a device, leading him to believe she is not human. Shortly afterwards, as the team of scientists discuss her abnormal traits, the camouflaged Ginko appears and reveals her true identity, explaining she is from Paira, a world on the same orbit as Earth but on the opposite side of the Sun. She then continues to reveal her mission, to warn Earth of an imminent collision of a rogue planet, which is dubbed "Planet R" by the media. They send a formal letter to the World Congress, which treats their communication with silent contempt (Japanese: mokusatsu). Only after they show Planet R and its rapid acceleration in the telescope does the World Congress launch its nuclear weapons, which ineffectively explode on its surface.

In the meantime, a group of spies have abducted Matsuda and are attempting to steal his formula to the nuclear device the disguised Pairan warned him about. Matsuda does not comply and is eventually tied to a chair in a remote building. As the Earth's atmosphere heats up due to the approaching world, Ginko again arrives to learn why Planet R is not yet destroyed. They locate Matsuda through Pairan technology and gather the formula for the device. The scientists then all watch as the nuclear device is shot from the space station and destroys Planet R, cooling the atmosphere and removing the threat. Ginko then changes back to her original form aboard the space station.

Cast
 Keizō Kawasaki as Dr. Toru Itsobe
 Toyomi Karita as Hikari Aozora / Ginko
 Bin Yagisawa as No. 2 Pairan
 Shōzō Nanbu as The Elder Dr. Itsobe
 Bontarō Miake as Dr. Kamura
 Mieko Nagai as Taeko Kamura
 Kiyoko Hirai as Mrs. Matsuda
 Isao Yamagata as Dr. Matsuda

Production
After the success of Toho's 1954 film Godzilla, which depicted a giant dinosaur attacking Tokyo, many Japanese film studios began to produce similar monster films, including Warning from Space. Along with other films such as Shintōhō's Fearful Attack of the Flying Saucers and the American Forbidden Planet, Warning from Space became part of a fledgling subgenre of films based around science fiction creatures. The film also used the theme of atomic bombs that was present in many films at the time, but showed how the weapons, which devastated the Japanese cities of Hiroshima and Nagasaki a decade earlier, could be put to good use. Still others noted the film used another common theme of cosmic collisions in the style of earlier films such as the 1931 film End of the World, which depicted a comet on a collision course with the Earth.

The Pairan aliens were designed by the prominent avant-garde artist Tarō Okamoto, which used a single eye that is common among science fiction aliens. Although official film posters showed the Pairan aliens towering over buildings, the actual cinematic version of the aliens were on the scale of humans, at about two meters. Walt Lee reports that Gentaro Nakajima's novel, on which this film was based, was in turn based on the Japanese folktale Kaguya-hime. The film was one of fourteen Japanese color pictures produced in early 1956, but the first color Japanese science-fiction film.

Release
Warning from Space was released in Japan on 29 January 1956.
Daiei also hoped to find a foreign market for Warning from Space, though the company found difficulty in selling it. Nevertheless, the film played at both King Cinema in Rangoon, Burma and Tai Khoon Theatre in Sandakan, Malaysia, in 1958. The film did help Daiei achieve some success in the genre. It was passed for release, anglicized as Warning from Space, by the BBFC in the United Kingdom in 1957, and later in the United States in 1963. The film was also released as The Mysterious Satellite in some areas. It was shown in the U.S. by American International Television later in the 1960s as Warning from Space.
 The film was released in Spain as Asalto a la Tierra, and in France as Le Satellite Mystérieux. Arrow Video released the film on Blu-ray in 2020.

Reception
In a contemporary review, "Neal." of Variety stated that the film was done with "candor and simplicity which makes it a good entry of its type" with "good special effects plus a fine use of color during the near approach of the flaming planet which nearly destroys the earth."

From retrospective reviews, a review included in the book A Guide to Apocalyptic Cinema, author Charles P. Mitchell called the film "bizarre" and gave it two stars. Similarly, in a 1978 issue of the magazine Cue, viewers were warned "don't watch it." In the 1986 Encyclopedia of Science Fiction Movies by Phil Hardy and Denis Gifford, the film is accused of using the science fiction clichés of flying saucers and atomic bombs. Gyan Prakash, in his book Noir Urbanisms: Dystopic Images of the Modern City, called the film "charming." The film was noted for its misleading characterization of astronomers, with one author observing that it advanced the cinematic portrayal of astronomers as scientists in lab coats peering through an enormous telescope.

In his biography of Stanley Kubrick, author John Baxter traces Kubrick's interest in science fiction films, which led to his 2001: A Space Odyssey, to the Japanese kaiju films of the 1950s, including Warning from Space, with its "nameless two-metre-tall black starfish with a single central eye, who walk en pointe like ballet dancers." Baxter notes that despite their "clumsy model sequences, the films were often well-photographed in colour... and their dismal dialogue was delivered in well-designed and well-lit sets."

Legacy
Critics have also noted plot similarities to the later Toho film Invasion of Astro-Monster, in that a friendly planet warns Japan of the atom bomb and subsequently assists in celestial defense.

The Pairans' asteroidean appearance is similar to that of a later pentagrammic creation, Starro, a villain from DC Comics' Justice League.

See also
List of Japanese films of 1956
List of science fiction films of the 1950s
The Invisible Man Appears

References

External links
 

 Warning from Space at the Japanese Movie Database

Films set in Tokyo
1956 films
Films directed by Koji Shima
1950s science fiction films
Japanese science fiction films
Daiei Film tokusatsu films
Space adventure films
Daiei Film films
American International Pictures films
Films with screenplays by Hideo Oguni
Films produced by Masaichi Nagata
Rogue planets in fiction
1950s Japanese films